K.G.F: Chapter 1 is a 2018 Indian Kannada-language period action film written and directed by Prashanth Neel, and produced by Vijay Kiragandur under the banner of Hombale Films. It is the first of two installments in the series, followed by K.G.F: Chapter 2. The film features an ensemble cast including Yash, Ramachandra Raju, Srinidhi Shetty, Vasishta N. Simha, Achyuth Kumar, Anant Nag, Archana Jois, T. S. Nagabharana, B. Suresha and Malavika Avinash. In the film, Rocky, a high-ranking gangster in Bombay seeks power and wealth in order to fulfill his mother's promise. He is hired to assassinate Garuda, who runs the operations at a gold mines in Kolar.

The film's development began in early 2015, after Neel finished writing the screenplay. Filming began two years later, in January 2017. Most of the film is set in the Kolar Gold Fields and was filmed in locales such as Kolar, Mysore, and parts of North Karnataka. The film's production was completed in August 2018. Bhuvan Gowda handled the cinematography and Srikanth Gowda edited the film. Composer Ravi Basrur scored the film.

The Kannada version of K.G.F: Chapter 1 was released on 20 December 2018 and the dubbed versions in Telugu, Tamil, Malayalam and Hindi released the next day. The film received positive reviews from critics and dialogues from the film became famous worldwide. Due to this, the film performed well commercially and collected  in its entire theatrical run, becoming the highest-grossing Kannada film and turned out to be a cult hit. At the 66th National Film Awards, the film won two awards for Stunt Choreography and Best Special Effects. At the 66th Filmfare Awards South, the film won two awards from five nominations, including the award for Best Film and Best Actor for Yash.

Plot 
Anand Ingalagi is a prominent journalist, whose book El Dorado, which detailed the events at the Kolar Gold Fields (K.G.F.) between 1951 and 2018, was banned by the Indian government, but "24/News" a television news channel procures a copy and interviews him.

In 1951, the government officials discovered gold ore in southern Mysore State where on the same day, Raja "Rocky" Krishnappa Bairya was born to a poor young woman named Shanti. Suryavardhan, a powerful crime boss and politician, who accompanied the officials has them killed and leases the land for 99 years under the pretext of running Narachi, a limestone mine, but secretly establishes K.G.F. He had five associates:

*Rajendra Desai - who oversees the transportation of refined gold bars to Bangalore and Mumbai from the factory at Varca, belonging to him and his adopted son Kamal.

*Kamal - son of Suryavardhan's partner Bhargav, who is adopted by Rajendra Desai after Bhargav's death, whose job is to look after Rajendra Desai's factory at Varca.

*Andrews - who oversees the gold given by Rajendra Desai and Kamal to the Western Coast of the country.

*Guru Pandian - president of the in-government DYSS party, who politically supports Suryavardhan.

*Adheera - Suryavardhan's brother, who is well-known for his ruthlessness, headed the K.G.F. security.

Suryavardhan suffers a stroke and appoints his elder son Garuda as the future heir of K.G.F. and Suryavardhan expected Adheera to serve as his son's aide. But Adheera unsuccessfully attempts to assassinate Garuda. In turn, Garuda bombs Adheera's car and he is presumed dead. Suryavardhan's associates now eye the riches of K.G.F. to get control of the place. For this, Rajendra Desai, Kamal and Andrews planned to assassinate Garuda, so they can easily capture K.G.F and Narachi. Rocky arrives in Bombay as a ten-year-old on a quest for wealth and power as desired by Shanti, and begins to work for Shetty, a gold smuggler and Andrews's underboss, who competes against a Dubai-based rival Inayat Khalil.

In 1978, Rocky rises in the ranks and oversees the arrival of African gold bars to the Bombay coast. Rocky's influence begins to rival Shetty's own. Andrews, who notices about Rocky offers him Bombay in return for assassinating Garuda. Rocky accepts the offer and heads to Bangalore; where he meets Desai's daughter Reena, falls in love with her and pursues her to accept him, much to her half-brother Kamal's chagrin and created rivalry between Rocky and Kamal. Meanwhile, a statue inauguration is organised for luring Garuda out of K.G.F. to assassinate him. With the help of Rajendra Desai, Andrew, Kamal and Andrew's secretary Daya, Rocky tried hard to assassinate Garuda, but the attempt is averted even before it begins when Rocky and his entire team is spotted by Garuda's bodyguards.

Rocky witnesses the authority and power that Garuda commands. Seeing no other option to murder Garuda, Rocky journeys to K.G.F., killing a unit of Garuda's henchmen to enter. The workers in K.G.F., who were forcibly kidnapped, are subjected to inhumane conditions and treated as slaves. Rocky becomes one of them and although apathetic at first, he is moved by the cold-blooded murder of a mother and son by a guard. Rocky stealthily accesses the map of the mine in the maintenance room during a roll call and narrowly escapes death after a fellow slave sacrifices himself to save the lives of his wife and unborn child. Andrews, Kamal and Desai are misinformed about the incident and assume Rocky is killed. Rocky engages in a fight with an entire unit of 23 guards, killing each one of them to rescue a blind slave they were about to finish.

With this act, Rocky emerges as a saviour in the slaves' eyes. He orders them to burn the guards' corpses to let Andrews's and his men know he is still alive via their informants, Kulkarni and Garuda's younger brother Virat. Garuda prepares to leave his residence to investigate the fire and missing guards. To avert this, Virat smothers Suryavardhan to death, and Garuda rushes back home. Shaken by the recent bad turn of events, Garuda orders Kaali's ritual to be rescheduled from the following week to the next day, planning to kill his father's allies as soon as the ritual is complete. At night, Rocky heads unsuspected through a tunnel to the site where Garuda has decided to behead three slaves as offerings to the goddess, as Vanaram discovers that the third slave is already killed in his prison cell. Upon Garuda's arrival and sacrifice of two slaves, a concealed Rocky, who had taken the third slave's place, emerges and kills him.

Ingalagi concludes that Rocky intentionally chose KGF as the location to assassinate Garuda, so that an army of slaves would help him seize control and also indicates that this is just the beginning. The news of Garuda's murder reaches Ramika Sen, a ruthless politician. Adheera, who is actually alive, plans to resurface his position in KGF and also Rajendra Desai, Kamal, Andrews, Guru Pandian, Daya, Shetty and Inaayat Khalil also rejoice with the news. Vanaram orders his men to attack Rocky, but the slaves attack the men and saves him.

Cast

Production

Pre-production 
Following the success of Mr. and Mrs. Ramachari (2014), Yash signed for four projects as of March 2015, including one with director Prashanth Neel (of Ugramm fame). The project, KGF, about an ambitious man and his life in the 1970s, was considered to be one of the most expensive films in Sandalwood cinema. Hombale Films, the production house led by Vijay Kiragandur, bankrolled the project, and one of its production executive Karthik Gowda, stated that "KGF, which is set in the 70s, took over one and a half years of pre-production, because they wanted to ensure they got every single detail right, be it the matchboxes, telephone, or the clothes people wore." The film's director, Prashanth Neel, stated that the film would be launched in April 2016, and the shooting would begin in May 2016. Ravi Basrur, who earlier scored music for the director's Ugramm, was hired for the project, while Bhuvan Gowda handled the cinematography.

In an interview with The Times of India, Prashanth Neel stated that he planned to split the film in two parts, as the narration of the story is in a non-linear format. The decision to split the film into two parts also had to do with its commercial prospects. He further added “The scale of the project is huge and we had a scope for a beginning, an interval, and an end for both parts, so it made sense for us to release it as two parts”. As for the decision to make it a multilingual release, he says that it was because the film is based on a unique idea and has a universal theme. About the rumours of doing KGF as a "Tamil version, with Suriya being roped in, but failing to do so", he stated that it was meant to be a Kannada film.

In December 2020, during the making of its second installment, Prasanth Neel denied rumours of a third installment in the KGF franchise, claiming that the story would conclude in its second part.

Development 
The film features an ensemble cast, most of them completely new faces. The cast members sported rugged looks, given the subject and setting of the film. Yash grew his beard and long hair for his role as Rocky, a slick and a suave person of the 1970s. Bangalore-based model Srinidhi Shetty, a winner of the Miss Supranational 2016, was cast alongside Yash. Srinidhi, a self-confessed fan of Yash, claimed that she had watched his films Drama and Mr. and Mrs. Ramachari, and stated that he is one of the actors to whom she looks forward. In August 2017, Vasishta Simha bagged a pivotal role in the film, while Ramya Krishnan and Nassar were falsely reported to be a part of the film.

In July 2016, the filmmakers kick-started a 15-day schedule in North Karnataka, without Yash, as the actor was shooting for Santhu Straight Forward (2016). The first schedule of the film took place on a huge set, which took more than 35–40 days to construct. The film was slated to take off earlier that year, but was pushed back because of problems surrounding the Kalasa Banduri issue, which meant the team had to cancel its initial shoot schedule plans. The schedule was further complicated by Yash's break from shooting films, in order to focus on his wedding to Radhika Pandit, which was held in Bangalore in December 2016.

Filming 
The film's shooting began on 15 January 2017, after completing the final stages of pre-production. On 25 January 2017, the filmmakers erected huge sets at Badami, to replicate Kolar in the period of 1970–80, thereby filming extensively in the location. The art director Shivakumar recreated the Kolar Gold Fields film set of the 1980s and VFX was used as an extension for the film. Aware that a freak accident happened at the sets of Masti Gudi (2017), claiming the lives of two actors, producer Kirangadur secured an insurance cover for the crew members working on the film. As of 25 June 2017, the project was 50 percent complete, and production had restarted after sets were rebuilt, following their destruction by heavy rains.

As a part of the film's shoot, the filmmakers painted a portion of the Jayalakshmi Vilas Mansion, which is located on the campus of University of Mysore. Some sequences of the movie, which has Yash and Srinidhi Shetty in the lead roles, were also shot at the centenary clock tower located next to the campus. Yash entered the final schedule of the film in April 2018. In May 2018, actors Malavika Avinash and Anant Nag filmed the interview sequence, one of the major scenes in the film's storyline. At the end of the month, Yash had announced that he had completed his portions, and started dubbing for the film. As of May 2018, the filmmakers completed major portions of the film, except one song.

In August 2018, Kajal Aggarwal was reported to shoot for a song sequence, thus marking her debut in Kannada. However, on 9 August, Tamannaah was hired for a song number, thus marking her second film appearance in Kannada, after Jaguar (2016). On 17 August 2018, the filmmakers announced that shooting of the film had wrapped, although another song shoot for the film's Hindi version, featuring Yash and Mouni Roy, took place at the Goregaon Studio on 7 and 8 December.

Themes and influences 
In an interview with director Prashanth Neel for The Times of India about the theme of the film, he stated "'KGF' has a strong texture of gold in it, which is about greed and gold. KGF, in many ways, is akin to El Dorado. The way kings and soldiers have over the years gone looking for the mythical El Dorado, where anyone who lays claim to the place ruled the world. This is what Anant Nag (narrator) says in the film, too.” Prashant explains about the setting of the film in 1970–80, stating, "In 1978, because of the Cold War between the USA and the erstwhile Soviet Union that had affected places like Iran and Afghanistan, the price of gold went up the highest in the recorded history. Till date, one cannot find another time when the price of gold shot up so much. So, 1978 was the perfect setting for us, because the higher the price of gold, the higher the greed of men.” The film was also inspired by action movies and western movies like The Good, the Bad and the Ugly and For a Few Dollars More.

Music

Ravi Basrur composed the soundtrack album and the film's score, while Tanishk Bagchi remastered the track "Gali Gali" from Tridev (1989) for the film's Hindi version.

The track "Salaam Rocky Bhai" served as the lead single from the soundtrack album. It was released in Kannada, Tamil, Telugu, and Malayalam on 7 December 2018, along with the full soundtrack album; the album for the Hindi version was released on 9 December 2018. The karaoke versions of the songs were released on 27 December 2018.

The film's score was released in two volumes; the first volume of the original soundtrack was released on 10 September 2019, and the second volume was released on 12 October 2019.

Marketing 
The first look of the film was released on 3 May 2017. On 8 January 2018, coinciding with Yash's birthday, a one-minute long introductory teaser, with Ananth Nag narrating, was unveiled by the production team. After responding to a fan's request, Yash announced that the film's trailer would be released in October 2018. Farhan Akhtar shared the first look on 6 November 2018 and a second one on 8 November on the occasion of Diwali. The official trailer of the film was released on 9 November 2018. The trailer crossed more than one million views within an hour of its release.

Special promotions were planned on 4 December in Chennai, and 6 December in Hyderabad. On 9 December 2018, the makers hosted a pre-release event at the JRC Convention Centre in Hyderabad to promote the film's Telugu version. S. S. Rajamouli graced the event as the chief guest. As a part of the film's promotion, an online game, KGF, specially designed for Android mobile phones, was released by Mobi2Fun Private Limited for the Google Play Store, which saw more than 5,000 downloads upon its initial release.

Release

Theatrical
On 28 August 2017, the filmmakers announced that KGF will be made as a multilingual film, released in Kannada, Malayalam, Tamil, Telugu, and Hindi languages, marking the first foray of its crew members (including Yash) into different industries. The filmmakers planned to release the film in the second half of 2018. On 19 September 2018, it was announced that the first part of the film will be released on 16 November 2018; however, the release was postponed to 21 December.

Distribution 
The distribution rights for the Kannada version were bought by KRG Studios, a sister company of Hombale Films. The film's Hindi version was distributed by Rithesh Sidhwani, Farhan Akhtar, and Anil Thadani, who bought the rights under their banners Excel Entertainment and AA Films. The rights for the Tamil and Telugu dubbed versions were sold to Vishal Film Factory and Vaaraahi Chalana Chitram. The Malayalam-dubbed rights of the film were sold to Global United Media.

Screenings and statistics 
K.G.F: Chapter 1 received a U/A certificate from the Central Board of Film Certification in early December 2018. It was reported that the film would be released to 1,800–2,200 screens worldwide, the widest ever release for a Kannada film. However, it was later reported that the film was released to 2,460 screens, including 1,500 for the Hindi version, 400 each for Kannada and Telugu, 100 for Tamil and 60 for Malayalam.

The advance booking for the shows were started on 16 December 2018, and saw a tremendous response upon its initial bookings. Following its response, the filmmakers allotted early morning shows at 4:00 a.m. for the preview. The film was released in the U.S. and Canada on 20 December 2018 and in India the following day. The day also saw releases in parts of Africa, Hong Kong, New Zealand and parts of Eastern Europe, including Cyprus, the first in these regions for a Kannada film. The film released in Malaysia on 28 December and in United Kingdom on 4 January 2019.

The Hindi-dubbed version of the film was released to 71 screens in Pakistan on 11 January and became the first Kannada film to be released there, although Lucia (2013) was screened at film festivals and had no theatrical release in the country.

Film festivals 
KGF was screened at the 11th Bangalore International Film Festival on 28 February 2019, where it received an award for the Best Picture in the Entertainment category, and was adjudged the most popular Kannada film by the jury members.

Lawsuit 
On 20 December 2018, the 10th Additional Chief Metropolitan Magistrate court in Bengaluru had passed an interim stay before the film's release, following two petitions, filed by Venkatesh G, Yogesh and Ratan, citing plagiarism allegations, and also accusing the filmmakers of portraying Kolar's history in a poor light. However, the producer Kiragandur stated that the film will be released on the said date, and asked fans to avoid rumours. On 27 December 2018, the filmmakers issued a statement that the shows in Australia were cancelled due to an unauthorized screening, as the distributors of the film did not consult the producers of the original.

Piracy 
On 18 December 2018, a few scenes from the film were leaked onto social networking sites, although Karthik Gowda, the executive producer, labeled it a rumour and clarified that the filmmakers have created a team to fight against online piracy. Despite preventative measures, pirated versions of the film were made available before its release. In May 2020, the producers sued a local television channel for premiering the film's Telugu version illegally.

Home media 
Colors Kannada bought the satellite rights for an undisclosed record price, and hosted its premiere on 30 March 2019. The Tamil version of the film was telecast through Colors Tamil on 7 April. Sony Pictures Networks acquired the satellite rights of the Hindi version.

The film's Telugu version was premiered on Star Maa on 5 July 2020, and registered an average TRP rating of 11.9, with many citing the delay of the premiere for more than 18 months after the theatrical release date. The Malayalam version of the movie was jointly purchased by Asianet and Kairali TV. The movie premiered on Asianet and Kairali TV on 14 December 2020.

Re-release 
The film was re-released in the United States to 35 locations on 31 January 2019, becoming the first Kannada film to be re-released in the country. On 1 November 2019, coinciding with the occasion of Kannada Rajyotsava, the filmmakers re-released the film at 25–30 centres across Karnataka, with a week run during its release. The film's Hindi version was re-released in PVR, Inox, and Cinepolis theatres, on 23–29 October 2020.

Reception

Box office 

On the first day of its release, KGF: Chapter 1 collected  worldwide, which was the highest opening in the Kannada film industry. The film grossed around  worldwide in the first week of its release, becoming the first Kannada film to gross . On 9 January 2019, trade analysts announced that the film entered the  mark, thus becoming the first Kannada film to do so.

India 
On the first day of release, KGF: Chapter 1 collected  net at the domestic box office. On the fourth day, the film collected approximately  while the Hindi version saw a jump of 45% on Monday. On 25 December 2018, the film saw a steep incline on the box office due to the Christmas holidays, collecting more than  upon release.

The film entered the  mark in Karnataka on the fifteenth day of box office, thus becoming the first film in Karnataka to do so.

Other territories 
Premiering at more than 100 theatres in 50 locations, K.G.F became the fastest Kannada film to cross $200k and $300k in the United States box office. As of 25 December, the film earned $413,214, becoming the first Kannada film to earn $400k at the box office. Within the end of the first week, K.G.F collected more than $522,848 at the box office, becoming the first Sandalwood film to cross a half million ($500k) dollars in United States.

During the second weekend, the film grossed $146,207, to take its total tally to $669,055, and it crossed the $700k mark within the second week. Thereafter, the tally saw a normal dip and the film ended its lifetime total at $805,637 in the country.

Apart from the US, the film collected £22,656 in United Kingdom, $9,539 in New Zealand, and RM 11,406 in Malaysia, to collect a cumulative $1.5 million in overseas profits.

Critical response
K.G.F: Chapter 1 received positive reviews from critics. While its cinematography, action sequences, music,  direction and cast performances of the ensemble cast received acclaim, critics had mixed comments about the writing and editing.

Reviewing for Deccan Herald, Vivek M. V. felt that the "grandeur" lay in the film's "fantastically gripping story". He praised the film's narration, its "brilliant" editing, and "riveting sequences". Sunayana Suresh of The Times of India gave the film rating of  stars out of five, writing that it had a "fast-paced first half ... but the second half and the climax sets up the right premise for the second part of the film." She called the screenplay's "non-linear" fashion the "most interesting part of the film". She commended Yash's performance, in that he "lives his character to the fullest". Troy Ribeiro of News18 echoed her sentiment, writing, "Yash's endurance, strife and sincerity ... get projected as perfunctory" in the context of "tight close-ups and mid-shots the camera stops us from getting emotionally connected to" every actor in the film. He further wrote, "With intense atmospheric lighting, every frame in the film looks aesthetic and natural. Brilliant cinematography and equally challenging action sequences are put together with razor-sharp edits. They give the film a racy pace." Priyanka Sundar of Hindustan Times called the film a "story of greed and redemption" that "burns bright". While praising the "promising" background score, "sharp" editing, and "stunning" visuals, she felt that the screenplay could have been "tighter".

Janani K. of India Today felt the film was "dragged and over-stretched", and gave it a three out of five-star rating. While she commended Yash's "extraordinary performance" and the "brilliantly choreographed stunt sequences", she wrote that despite having "universal theme, [the film] gets lost in translation, thanks to sloppy editing and atrocious dialogues." Subha J. Rao of Firstpost gave the film a similar rating, and praised the film's music, cinematography, and art direction, particularly the latter in "bringing alive the grime and heat of the gold mines". However, she felt "[t]ighter editing ... would have smoothened out the kinks" in the film. Shashiprasad S. M. of Deccan Chronicle scored the film  stars out of five, describing the film as "a visual spectacle". Barring that, he felt it fell short of "instilling the much-needed life into it." Karthik Keramalu of Film Companion felt that the film fell short of "becoming a great movie by a long mile". He dismissed the dialogue delivered by Yash's character as a "lengthy sermon about his own valour", while also criticizing the film's editing.

Excluding what he described the film's climax as "spectacular with the support of a brilliant cast" and "spot-on" sets and location, Muralidhara Khajane of The Hindu felt there was "nothing in the film that we have not seen before". While writing that "[t]here is a certain finesse to the edgy, moody cinematography", he concluded that the film lacked a "soul, a believable story, and a rounded protagonist." Manoj Kumar R. of The Indian Express scored the film  stars out of five, deeming it "[a]n overstretched exercise in hero worship". While drawing comparisons of certain scenes to those from Baahubali, he felt the film had a "flimsy storyline", which he added was made up for by its "terrific background orchestra". Also writing for the same news publication, Shubhra Gupta drew comparisons of the film in plot to those of Nayakan, Deewaar, and Parinda in its first half. She felt that the film had "nothing more" than "striking cinematography, and the brown and sepia colours which suffuse the screen."

The character of Rocky was well received by critics. Janani K. of India Today said that "You take a look at [Rocky] and instantly you know that this guy will do the impossible and pull people out of their misery." Sunaina Suresh of Times of India said that "The growth of Rocky is shown steadily and the makers kept a clever story telling pattern right through that keeps pace with the narrative." Suresh further added: "The first chapter shows Rocky as the maverick mastermind who will stop at nothing in order to achieve his mission." Troy Ribeiro of News18 said that "Rocky is the new Superhero in the town."

Accolades

Sequel 

Before the release of the first K.G.F film in December 2018, the filmmakers shot 20% of its second installment, with the crew doing double shifts till January 2019. The film has Yash and Srinidhi Shetty reprising their roles from the first film, while Sanjay Dutt and Raveena Tandon were cast in pivotal new roles. The shooting of the film kick-started on 13 March 2019.

K.G.F: Chapter 2 was originally scheduled to hit theatres on 23 October 2020, but its release was postponed due to the COVID-19 pandemic in India. In January 2021, the filmmakers announced a new release date of 16 July 2021 but again got postponed due to the same reason. On 22 August 2021, the filmmakers announced that the film will release on 14 April 2022. Finally Chapter 2 was released on 14 April 2022 in Kannada, and in dubbed versions for the Telugu, Hindi, Tamil, and Malayalam languages.

Legacy 

The film was praised by many celebrities across the South Indian film industry. Director Pa. Ranjith praised the team after watching the trailer of the film, while Puneeth Rajkumar and Shah Rukh Khan also appreciated Yash and the filmmakers. Raveena Tandon, Rashmika Mandanna, Ram Gopal Varma, and Sumalatha Ambareesh (wife of late actor Ambareesh) also praised Yash's performance. Tamil actor Vijay, who watched a special screening of the film on 20 January 2019 in Chennai, praised the team for its brilliant filmmaking, and Yash for his performance.

Following the box office performance of the film, on 3 January 2019, the Income Tax Department raided the homes of several film stars and producers from the Kannada industry, including Yash and the film's producer, Vijay Kiragandur, and its actors have also been asked to provide details of Yash's remuneration for the film, shedding light on the fact that the movie's performance was considered to be the reason behind the IT raid.

In a March 2018 interview with IANS, Yash stated that "The success of K.G.F: Chapter 1 boosted the morale of the Kannada film industry. This success means a lot to all the untapped talent of our industry". K.G.F also established Kannada cinema in the multilingual film market, with the 2019 releases Pailwaan, Kurukshetra, and Avane Srimannarayana being released in multiple languages. Shjilpa Sebastian wrote an article for The Hindu, "2019: The Year when Kannada Cinema Went National", in which she stated that the film "changed the game plan for the Kannada film industry".

K.G.F became the most streamed film on Amazon Prime Video on 2019. Director Nagathihalli Chandrashekhar, chairman of the Karnataka Chalanachitra Academy, praised the film, stating: "We can expect more 'KGF's in the future. Not everyone can make a 'KGF', but its success can inspire more quality filmmaking using both local and international technicians."

See also 
 Kannada cinema
 List of films featuring slavery
 Mining in India
 Kolar Gold Fields
 K.G.F: Chapter 2

References

External links 
 
 
 

2010s Kannada-language films
2018 action drama films
2010s vigilante films
Indian films about revenge
Films set in the 1970s
Films set in the 1980s
Indian gangster films
Indian action drama films
Period action films
Indian historical action films
Films that won the Best Special Effects National Film Award
2018 masala films
Indian pregnancy films
Indian vigilante films
Films set in Mumbai
Films shot in Mumbai
Films set in Karnataka
Films shot in Karnataka
Films about mining
Cold War films
Films set in 1978
Films about Indian slavery
Films directed by Prashanth Neel